Fotis Kaimakamoudis (born 2 January 1993) is a Greek professional footballer who plays as a forward for Gamma Ethniki club Atsalenios.

Club career
Born in Thessaloniki, Kaimakamoudis began his football career with the infrastructure segments of Atromitos in Athens. During his spell with the U-20 outfit between 2009 and 2012, Kaimakamoudis amassed over 50 caps and scored a total of 28 goals.  During the same time, he was called-up for the national U-19 team, scoring twice in 11 games.

He was promoted to Atromitos' first team in 2011, but would not feature in any games during a six month spell in the 2011−12 Superleague season. Subsequently, Kaimakamoudis spent the next two-and-a-half seasons on loan in various Gamma Ethniki clubs, before being released by Atromitos to join Irodotos in the Gamma Ethniki in 2014. He then went on to play for Ionikos for six months before returning to Glyfada until the end of the 2014−15 season.

The next season, Kaimakamoudis signed for Gamma Ethniki title contenders Fostiras, narrowly missing out on promotion to the Football League by eventual Group winners OFI Crete. He then signed for Ergotelis, an ex-Superleague club assembled to swiftly return to professional competitions. He contributed to Ergotelis' successful championship run with 7 goals in 25 matches, coming in mostly as a back-up striker. In July 2017, Kaimakamoudis signed with fellow Gamma Ethniki side Kifisia.

References

External links
 

1993 births
Living people
Greek footballers
A.E. Kifisia F.C. players
Ergotelis F.C. players
Fostiras F.C. players
A.O. Glyfada players
Ionikos F.C. players
Ilisiakos F.C. players
Atromitos F.C. players
Footballers from Thessaloniki
Association football forwards